Poly diamond powder is a kind of synthetic diamond which is synthesized through explosion method. Compared to mono diamond, poly diamond powder has more crystal edges and grinding surface, every crystal edges have grinding force. During the polishing process, the big grit can fall into small pieces so it can keep the sustaining grinding force without scratches.

Production method 
Detonation——Purification——Shaping——Grading——Finished Product

Application 
Poly diamond powder mainly is used in sapphire substrate, diaphragm, and LED chips etc.

Abrasives
Synthetic diamond